Williston is a city in Levy County, Florida, United States. As of the 2010 census it had a population of 2,768.

History
The city was established before 1885 by J.M. Willis, who named it after himself.

Geography

Williston is located at  (29.386811, –82.446706).

Demographics

As of the census of 2000, there were 2,297 people, 836 households, and 580 families residing in the city. The racial makeup of the city was 73.44% White, 22.81% African American, 0.78% Native American, 0.74% Asian, 0.44% Pacific Islander, 1.09% from other races, and 1.09% from two or more races. Hispanic or Latino of any race were 3.57% of the population.

There were 836 households, out of which 31.8% had children under the age of 18 living with them, 42.9% were married couples living together, 22.0% had a female householder with no husband present, and 30.6% were non-families. 25.6% of all households were made up of individuals, and 12.7% had someone living alone who was 65 years of age or older.  The average household size was 2.56 and the average family size was 3.03.

In the city the population was spread out, with 26.2% under the age of 18, 8.6% from 18 to 24, 25.2% from 25 to 44, 20.3% from 45 to 64, and 19.8% who were 65 years of age or older.  The median age was 38 years. For every 100 females, there were 86.1 males. For every 100 females age 18 and over, there were 76.9 males.

The median income for a household in the city was $25,795, and the median income for a family was $26,918. Males had a median income of $22,331 versus $20,634 for females. The per capita income for the city was $15,628. About 22.4% of families and 22.6% of the population were below the poverty line, including 28.1% of those under age 18 and 22.5% of those age 65 or over.

Arts and culture
Williston hosts the Central Florida Harvest and Peanut Festival every October.

Sports

Devil's Den and Blue Grotto
Williston is home to Devil's Den and Blue Grotto, popular diving spots and part of the extensive underground spring system present in the area.

Kentucky Derby
Williston is the birthplace of Foolish Pleasure, winner of the 1975 Kentucky Derby.

Infrastructure

Transportation
The area includes Williston Municipal Airport (X60), a city-owned, public-use airport located two nautical miles (4 km) southwest of the central business district of Williston.

Climate
The climate in this area is characterized by hot, humid summers and generally mild to cool winters.  According to the Köppen Climate Classification system, Williston has a humid subtropical climate, abbreviated "Cfa" on climate maps.

Education
School Board of Levy County operates public schools:
 Williston High School (6–12)
 Williston Elementary School (3–5)
 Joyce Bullock Elementary School (PK–2)

Library
Levy County provides Williston with a local library branch. The Williston Public Library is located in the former, historic Perkins State Bank; one of Florida's oldest banks.

References

External links
 
 City of Williston official website
 Williston Chamber of Commerce
 Williston, Florida, at City-Data.com

 
Cities in Levy County, Florida
Cities in Florida